Andrés Arraez (born 3 March 1959) is a Venezuelan former swimmer. He competed in two events at the 1976 Summer Olympics.

References

External links
 

1959 births
Living people
Venezuelan male swimmers
Olympic swimmers of Venezuela
Swimmers at the 1976 Summer Olympics
Place of birth missing (living people)
20th-century Venezuelan people